Shapoklyak (from French chapeau claque) is a 1974 Soviet Russian animated film by Roman Kachanov.

Synopsis
Gena the Crocodile and Cheburashka decide to go to the sea on vacation. Shapoklyak steals their train tickets, so they are kicked off the train. On their way home, the duo, with Shapoklyak's help, stops hikers from poaching and a factory from polluting a river.

Creators
Scriptwriters: Eduard Uspensky, Roman Kachanov
Director: Roman Kachanov
Art director: Leonid Shvartsman
Operators: Alexander Zhukovsky, Theodor Bunimovich
Composer: Vladimir Shainsky
Sound technician: Georgy Martynyuk
Animators: Maya Buzinova, Natalya Dabizha, Yuri Norstein, Pavel Petrov, Boris Savin
Editor: Natalya Abramova
Director: Nathan Bitman

Cast
Vasily Livanov as Gena the Crocodile
Irina Mazing as Shapoklyak
Klara Rumyanova as Cheburashka
Vladimir Ferapontov as Gena (singing voice)

Soundtrack
This film contains a famous Russian song called "Blue Train Car" by the composer Vladimir Shainsky on Eduard Uspensky's verses. It is sung at the end of the film by Gena.

Trivia
Though the city Cheburashka and Gena live in is unnamed, it is implied to be Moscow. This is hinted when Cheburashka and Gena take the train from Moscow to Yalta and also when they have to walk home (they find a distance sign pointing to Moscow).

External links
Shapoklyak at Animator.ru
 Shapoklyak on Russian Film Hub

1974 films
1974 animated films
1970s Russian-language films
Films based on works by Eduard Uspensky
Films directed by Roman Abelevich Kachanov
Soyuzmultfilm
Soviet animated films